Puzzle Muteson is a project of singer/songwriter Terry Magson, from the Isle of Wight. Born in London, he attended music college for a short period but decided to continue his musical explorations on his own, developing his songwriting and voice, whilst teaching himself guitar.

Career
His debut album, En Garde,
 on which he worked with Valgeir Sigurdsson and Nico Muhly, was released in 2011 through Bedroom Community records; based in Reykjavík, Iceland.

Tours
He has toured the UK and Ireland, supporting, amongst others: The Fruit Bats, Death Vessel and Sub Pop.

Discography 
 2011: En Garde (Bedroom Community)
 2014: Theatrics (Bedroom Community)
 2018: Swum (Bedroom Community)

References

British songwriters
Living people
Year of birth missing (living people)